HMS Engadine was a  cargo ship laid down at the Greenock Dockyard Company, Greenock, Scotland on 16 March 1940, launched on 26 May 1941 and completed on 17 November 1941.

However the Admiralty requisitioned her for the Royal Navy before completion and renamed after the first  for use as a seaplane depot ship.

She was loaned to the United States Navy from November 1942 until July 1943. After the war, she was restored to Clan Line in 1946 and given her originally-intended name. The ship was scrapped at Cartagena, Spain in November 1962.

References

1941 ships
Cameron-class steamships
Ships built on the River Clyde
World War II merchant ships of the United Kingdom